Ben Jones (born c. 1880; date of death unknown) was an English footballer who played one game in the Football League for Burslem Port Vale in April 1905.

Career
Jones played for Alsagers Bank Church, before joining Burslem Port Vale in August 1904. His only appearance was at centre-half in an 8–1 thumping by Liverpool at Anfield on 8 April 1905. He was released from the Athletic Ground at the end of the 1905–06 season, at which point he moved on to Alsagers Bank United and then Halmerend Gymnastics, before returning to old club Alsagers Bank Church.

Career statistics
Source:

References

Sportspeople from Newcastle-under-Lyme
English footballers
Association football midfielders
Port Vale F.C. players
English Football League players
1880 births
Year of death missing